The Karry K50 is a compact MPV produced by the Chinese manufacturer Chery Automobile under the Karry brand.

Overview

The K50 is a seven-seat MPV that started rolling off the production line in Kaifeng, Henan, on September 2, 2014, and was available in showrooms in early 2015. The K50 is powered by an ACTECO 1.5-liter engine.

The Karry K50 was produced from January 2015 with a price range of 44,900 to 73,800 yuan. The Karry K50 also serves as the base of the Karry K60 crossover.

References

External links
Official website of the Karry K50

K50
Minivans
Compact MPVs
Front-wheel-drive vehicles
Cars introduced in 2015
Cars of China
2010s cars